Sóndor (possibly from Quechua suntur: congress, meeting) is an archaeological site in Peru built by the Chanka people.  The main part consists of a temple like structure used for religious and astronomical purposes. It is located in the Apurímac Region, Andahuaylas Province, Pacucha District.

References 

  

Archaeological sites in Peru
Archaeological sites in Apurímac Region